The following is a list of animated films by the number of tickets sold at the box office.

List
In total, 34 animated films have sold more than 40million tickets. The most notable years are 2001, 2016, and 2019 with three films each, while Toy Story is the most represented franchise with four films. Disney produced the most, with a total of 16 films on the list.

Some of the data is incomplete due to a lack of available admissions data from a number of countries. It is not an exhaustive list of all the highest-grossing animated films by ticket sales, and no rankings are given.

Computer animation
In total, 34 computer-animated films have sold more than 30million tickets. The most represented year is 2016 with four films, while Shrek and Toy Story are the franchises with the most film, with four each. Pixar produced the most, with 16 films on the list.

Some of the data is incomplete due to a lack of available admissions data from a number of countries. It is not an exhaustive list of all the highest-grossing computer-animated films by ticket sales, and no rankings are given.

Traditional animation
In total, 29 traditionally animated films have sold over 20million tickets. The most represented year is 1998 with four films. Disney produced the most, with 21 films on the list.

Some of the data is incomplete due to a lack of available admissions data from a number of countries. It is not an exhaustive list of all the highest-grossing traditionally animated films by ticket sales, and no rankings are given.

Stop motion
The following table lists known estimated box office ticket sales for various high-grossing stop motion films. Laika produced the most, with six films, while the most represented year is 2012 with three films.

Some of the data is incomplete due to a lack of available admissions data from a number of countries. It is not an exhaustive list of all the highest-grossing stop motion films by ticket sales, and no rankings are given.

See also
 List of films by box office admissions
 List of highest-grossing animated films
 List of highest-grossing anime films
 Lists of highest-grossing films

Notes

References

Animated
Highest-grossing
Highest-grossing animated